Montenero d'Orcia is a village in Tuscany, central Italy, administratively a frazione of the comune of Castel del Piano, province of Grosseto, in the area of Mount Amiata. At the time of the 2001 census its population amounted to 253.

Montenero is about 44 km from Grosseto and 14 km from Castel del Piano, and it is situated on a hill between the valley of Orcia and Ombrone rivers.

Main sights 

 Pieve di Santa Lucia (12th century), main parish church of the village, with a wooden Crocefisso by Ambrogio Lorenzetti
 Church of Madonna (16th century), former church now deconsecrated
 Walls of Montenero, old fortifications which surround the village since the 10th century
 Cassero Senese, a 13th-century fortress, it was re-built in the 15th century
 Museum of Vine and Wine, little museum of local history about the traditions of grape growing and wine production in Montenero

References

Bibliography 
 Aldo Mazzolai, Guida della Maremma. Percorsi tra arte e natura, Le Lettere, Florence, 1997
 Giuseppe Guerrini, Torri e castelli della Provincia di Grosseto, Nuova Immagine Editrice, Siena, 1999

See also 
 Castel del Piano
 Montegiovi
 Val d'Orcia

Frazioni of the Province of Grosseto